Mount Frink is a plateau-like mesa on Vancouver Island, British Columbia, Canada, located  west of Courtenay and  southeast of Mount Albert Edward 
Most often Frink is climbed as part of a traverse, circumnavigating the high ridge that wraps around Moat Lake from Castlecraig Mountain to Mt. Albert Edward.

Beyond tagging the summit via the ridge traverse, the only other noteworthy route is the West face which had its first recorded ascent done in the winter of 1999/2000 over New Years by Alex and Dave Ratson. Graded at AI III (AI= Alpine ice) with a few mixed moves in the lower portion of the route.

See also
 List of mountains of Canada

References

Vancouver Island Ranges
One-thousanders of British Columbia
Comox Land District